Österbymo is a locality and the seat of Ydre Municipality, Östergötland County, Sweden with 834 inhabitants in 2010. It is the smallest municipal seat in Sweden.

References 

Municipal seats of Östergötland County
Swedish municipal seats
Populated places in Östergötland County
Populated places in Ydre Municipality